Archimede Nardi (born April 19, 1916) was an Italian professional football player.

He played 3 games in the Serie A in the 1936/37 season for A.S. Roma.

1916 births
Year of death missing
Italian footballers
Serie A players
A.S. Roma players
U.S. Salernitana 1919 players
S.S. Juve Stabia players
Association football goalkeepers